Agonopterix parilella is a moth of the family Depressariidae. It is found in France, Germany, Italy, Switzerland, Austria, the Czech Republic, Poland, Slovakia, Hungary, Croatia, Romania, the Baltic region, Sweden and Russia.

The wingspan is 13–17 mm. Adults are on wing from June to August.

The larvae feed on Peucedanum species, including Peucedanum cervaria and Peucedanum oreoselinum.

References

External links
lepiforum.de

Moths described in 1835
Agonopterix
Moths of Europe